Andrei Mihailavich Khripach (born 28 May 1972) is a Belarusian professional football coach and former player.

Career
Born in Zhodino, Khripach began playing professional football with FC Fandok Bobruisk in 1992. He joined FC MPKC Mozyr in 1994, where he would win the Belarusian Cup in 1996. He moved to FC Belshina Bobruisk in 1996, and would play seven seasons for Belshina, winning three Belarusian Cup and one Belarusian Premier League titles.

Khripach would finish his career playing for FC Baranovichi and FC Dnepr Rogachev. He appeared in more than 250 Belarusian league matches during his career, scoring 20 goals.

Khripach made four appearances for the Belarus national football team, all of them friendlies. His debut was as a second-half substitute in a friendly against Ukraine in 1994.

Honours
MPKC Mozyr
Belarusian Premier League champion: 1996
Belarusian Cup winner: 1995–96

Belshina Bobruisk
Belarusian Premier League champion: 2001
Belarusian Cup winner: 1996–97, 1998–99, 2000–01

References

External links
 

1972 births
Living people
Belarusian footballers
Association football defenders
Belarus international footballers
FC Belshina Bobruisk players
FC Fandok Bobruisk players
FC Slavia Mozyr players
FC Baranovichi players
FC Dnepr Rogachev players
Belarusian football managers
FC Viktoryja Marjina Horka managers
People from Zhodzina
Sportspeople from Minsk Region